Räpina Parish is a rural municipality of Estonia, in Põlva County. It has a population of 4,611 (as of 2017) and an area of 265.93 km².

Settlements
Town
Räpina

Small borough
Võõpsu

Villages
Jaanikeste - Kassilaane - Kõnnu - Köstrimäe - Leevaku - Linte - Mägiotsa - Meelva - Naha - Nulga - Pääsna - Pindi - Raadama - Rahumäe - Raigla - Ristipalo - Ruusa - Saareküla - Sillapää - Sülgoja - Suure-Veerksu - Toolamaa - Tooste - Tsirksi - Võiardi - Võuküla

Religion

References

External links